Hypurus is a genus of minute seed weevils in the beetle family Curculionidae. There is at least one described species in Hypurus, H. bertrandi.

References

Further reading

External links

 

Curculionidae
Articles created by Qbugbot